Tessella was an international analytics and data science consulting services company owned by Capgemini. It is now the Hybrid Intelligence team, within Capgemini Engineering.

History

Tessella was founded in 1980 by Kevin Gell. Tessella moved to its first permanent office in Abingdon, Oxfordshire, in 1987. Tessella established a United States operations in 2004 in Newton, Massachusetts. Tessella purchased Analyticon, a technical consultancy in the space and defence industries, in 2005. In 2009 Tessella expanded its services to include consulting. In July 2012 Tessella existing management team completed a management buy out. Mobeus Equity Partners supported the buyout and founder Kevin Gell retained a significant minority stake and continued to serve as a board member. After the MBO, Tessella expanded its consulting and technology services to explicitly include analytics as a core capability. In December 2015 Altran acquired Tessella. In April 2020 Capgemini acquired Altran and Tessella became part of Capgemini Engineering. On 1 April 2022, Tessella ceased to be its own legal entity and is now fully integrated within Capgemini Engineering as the Hybrid Intelligence team.

Awards and honours
2015 UK IT Awards Highly Commended in the Not for Profit category
2014 UK IT Awards Innovative Mobile App of the Year
2014 Bio-IT World Best Practices Award
2013 European Rail Congress Awards
2011 The National Archives and Tessella win the Queen’s Award for Enterprise Innovation
2009 Bio-IT World Best Practices Award
2012-17 Best Places to Work Ranks Tessella as Outstanding

References

Companies based in Oxfordshire
Companies established in 1980
Science and technology in Oxfordshire